Jomu Mbili (born 16 October 1981) is a South African cricketer. He is a right-handed batsman and a right-arm medium-fast bowler. He was born in Pietermaritzburg.

Mbili made his first-class debut for KwaZulu-Natal Inland during the 2008–09 season.

See also
Cricket in South Africa

References

External links
Jomu Mbili at Cricinfo

1981 births
Living people
South African cricketers
KwaZulu-Natal Inland cricketers